The 1977 NFL season was the 58th regular season of the National Football League. The two second-year expansion teams switched conferences, with the Seattle Seahawks moving from the NFC West to the AFC West, and the Tampa Bay Buccaneers transferring from the AFC West to the NFC Central.

Instead of a traditional Thanksgiving Day game hosted by the Dallas Cowboys, the league scheduled a Miami Dolphins at St. Louis Cardinals contest. This would be only the second season since 1966 that the Cowboys did not play on that holiday. It marked the last time that the Cowboys did not play on Thanksgiving.

This was the last NFL regular season with 14 games. The regular season was expanded to 16 games in 1978, with the preseason reduced from six games to four.  It was also the final season of the eight-team playoff field in the NFL, before going to ten the following season.

The 1977 season is considered the last season of the “Dead Ball Era” of professional football (1970 to 1977). The 17.2 average points scored per team per game was the lowest since 1942, and it was the only post-merger NFL season where no player surpassed 1,000 receiving yards. For 1978, the league made significant changes to allow greater offensive production.

The season ended with Super Bowl XII when the Cowboys defeated the Denver Broncos.

Player movement

Transactions
May 2, 1977: Earl Morrall, the oldest player on the 1972 Miami Dolphins championship roster announced his retirement from professional football.

Draft
The 1977 NFL Draft was held from May 3 to 4, 1977 at New York City’s Roosevelt Hotel. With the first pick, the Tampa Bay Buccaneers selected running back Ricky Bell from the University of Southern California.

New Referees
Tommy Bell retired after the 1976 season. His line judge, Jerry Markbreit, was named his successor. Bell worked two Super Bowls, III and VII. Markbreit would work four Super Bowls, and is (as of 2022) the only referee to achieve this.

Major rule changes
The head slap is outlawed. This change is referred to as the "Deacon Jones Rule"; the Los Angeles Rams' defensive end frequently used this technique.
Any shoe worn by a player with an artificial limb must have a kicking surface that conforms to that of a normal kicking shoe. Informally referred to as the "Tom Dempsey Rule." Dempsey was a record-breaking placekicker whose modified shoe (having a flattened and enlarged toe area) on his deformed kicking foot generated controversy during his career.
Defenders are only permitted to make contact with receivers once. 
Defenders are not allowed to make contact with an opponent above the shoulders with the palms of their hands, except to ward him off the line.
Offensive linemen are not allowed to thrust their hands to a defender’s neck, face, or head.
Wide receivers are not allowed to clip defenders.
This was the first season when the statistic for time of possession began to be recorded.

Division races
Tampa Bay and Seattle continued as "swing" teams that did not participate in regular conference play. Every other NFL team played a home-and-away series against the other members in its division, two or three interconference games, and the remainder of their 14-game schedule against other conference teams. Tampa Bay switched to the NFC and played the other 13 members of the conference, while Seattle did the same in the AFC. The teams met in Week Five, with Seattle winning 30–23.

Starting in 1970, and through 2001, except for the strike-shortened 1982 season, there were three divisions (Eastern, Central and Western) in each conference. This was the final season as the winners of each division, and a fourth "wild card" team based on the best non-division winner, qualified for the playoffs. The tiebreaker rules were changed to start with head-to-head competition, followed by division records, common opponents records, and conference play.

National Football Conference

* other teams with same W-L record

American Football Conference

* other teams with same W-L record

Regular season
Highlights of the 1977 season included:
Thanksgiving: Two games were played on Thursday, November 24, featuring Chicago at Detroit. Chicago would prevail in a 31-14 final. The Miami Dolphins visited St. Louis to play the Cardinals, defeating them by a 55-14 mark. Dolphins quarterback Bob Griese would throw for six touchdown passes versus the Cardinals. The Dolphins would set a franchise record for most points scored in one game with 55. Of note, the Dolphins would score eight touchdowns and accumulate 34 first downs.

Final standings

Tiebreakers
Baltimore finished ahead of Miami in the AFC East based on better conference record (9–3 to Dolphins’ 8–4).
N.Y. Jets finished ahead of Buffalo in the AFC East based on better point-differential in head-to-head competition (1 point).
Houston finished ahead of Cincinnati in the AFC Central based on better point-differential in head-to-head competition (2 points).
Minnesota finished ahead of Chicago in the NFC Central based on  better point-differential in head-to-head competition (3 points).
Chicago won the NFC Wild Card over Washington based on better net points in conference games (48 to Redskins’ 4).
Philadelphia finished ahead of N.Y. Giants in the NFC East based on head-to-head sweep (2–0).

Playoffs

Awards

Coaching changes

Offseason
Atlanta Falcons: Leeman Bennett was named permanent head coach. Marion Campbell was fired after a 1-4 start to the 1976 season. General manager Pat Peppler served as interim for the rest of that season.
Buffalo Bills: Jim Ringo was named permanent head coach. He was named interim head coach when Lou Saban resigned after the fifth game of the 1976 season.
Denver Broncos: John Ralston was replaced by Red Miller.
Detroit Lions: Tommy Hudspeth began his first full season as head coach. He replaced Rick Forzano, who left after the team lost three of its first four games in 1976.
New York Giants: John McVay began his first season as head coach. He replaced Bill Arnsparger, who was fired after the team lost its first seven games in 1976.
New York Jets: Walt Michaels became the Jets' new head coach. Lou Holtz resigned prior to the last game of the 1976 season, and Mike Holovak served as interim for the team's final game.
San Francisco 49ers: Ken Meyer replaced the fired Monte Clark.

In-season
Cleveland Browns: Forrest Gregg was fired before the last game of the season. Defensive coordinator Dick Modzelewski served as interim during the team's final game.
Kansas City Chiefs: After an 0–5 start, Paul Wiggin was fired. Defensive backs coach Tom Bettis was named interim.

Uniform changes
 The Tampa Bay Buccaneers changed the color scheme of the numbers on their white jerseys. In 1976, the numbers were orange with red trim; in 1977, they became red with orange trim to increase visibility.

Television
This was the fourth and final year under the league's broadcast contracts with ABC, CBS, and NBC to televise Monday Night Football, the NFC package, and the AFC package, respectively. All three networks renewed their deals for another four years. Don Meredith returned to ABC after spending three seasons at NBC, while Alex Karras returned to his acting career. John Brodie was promoted to replace Meredith as NBC's lead color commentator, while Merlin Olsen replaced Brodie on the network's #2 team. NBC also renamed its pregame show, referring to it as NFL '77 to start and updating the program's title every new season.

References

 NFL Record and Fact Book
 NFL History 1971–1980 (Last accessed December 4, 2005)
 Total Football: The Official Encyclopedia of the National Football League
 1977 Regular season Standings (Last accessed April 24, 2014)

 
National Football League seasons
National Football League